Lowndes is an unincorporated community in eastern Wayne County, Missouri, United States. It is located approximately twenty miles southwest of Marble Hill, along Missouri Route E. Bear Creek flows past the north side of the community and Barnes Creek is just east of the community.

A post office called Lowndes has been in operation since 1840. The community has the name of Lowndes Henry Davis, a Missouri congressman.

Notable person
Leo Goodwin, Sr., founder of GEICO, was born here in 1886.

References

Unincorporated communities in Wayne County, Missouri
Unincorporated communities in Missouri